Andrew Tembo (born 19 August 1971) is a former Zambian football midfielder.

Tembo previously played 284 matches and scored 15 goals for Odense BK, having joined them in the summer of 1997 from Olympique Marseille, where he had a short spell. Prior to that he played for Zamsure FC.

Tembo has 35 caps for the Zambian national team.

In 2012, he was selected to Odense BKs all-time top-11 "De største striber" (The greatest "stripes") by OBs fans.

References

External links

1971 births
Living people
Zambian footballers
Zambian expatriate footballers
Zambia international footballers
Olympique de Marseille players
Odense Boldklub players
Ølstykke FC players
Ligue 2 players
Danish Superliga players
Expatriate footballers in France
Expatriate men's footballers in Denmark
1996 African Cup of Nations players
1998 African Cup of Nations players
2000 African Cup of Nations players
Association football midfielders